The Short S.25 Sunderland is a British flying boat patrol bomber, developed and constructed by Short Brothers for the Royal Air Force (RAF). The aircraft took its service name from the town (latterly, city) and port of Sunderland in North East England.

Developed in parallel with the civilian S.23 Empire flying boat, the flagship of Imperial Airways, the Sunderland was developed specifically to conform to the requirements of British Air Ministry Specification R.2/33 for a long-range patrol/reconnaissance flying boat to serve with the Royal Air Force (RAF). As designed, it served as a successor to the earlier Short Sarafand flying boat. Sharing several similarities with the S.23, it featured a more advanced aerodynamic hull and was outfitted with various offensive and defensive armaments, including machine gun turrets, bombs, aerial mines, and depth charges. The Sunderland was powered by four Bristol Pegasus XVIII radial engines and was outfitted with various detection equipment to aid combat operations, including the Leigh searchlight, the ASV Mark II and ASV Mark III radar units, and an astrodome.

The Sunderland was one of the most powerful and widely used flying boats throughout the Second World War. In addition to the RAF, the type was operated by other Allied military air wings, including the Royal Australian Air Force (RAAF), Royal Canadian Air Force (RCAF), South African Air Force (SAAF), Royal New Zealand Air Force (RNZAF), French Navy, Norwegian Air Force, and the Portuguese Navy. During the conflict, the type was heavily involved in Allied efforts to counter the threat posed by German U-boats in the Battle of the Atlantic. On 17 July 1940, a RAAF Sunderland (of No. 10 Squadron) performed the type's first unassisted U-boat kill. Sunderlands also played a major role in the Mediterranean theatre, performing maritime reconnaissance flights and logistical support missions. During the evacuation of Crete, shortly after the German invasion of the island, several aircraft were used to transport troops. Numerous unarmed Sunderlands were also flown by civil operator British Overseas Airways Corporation (BOAC), traversing routes as far afield as the Pacific Ocean.

During the post-war era, use of the Sunderland throughout Europe rapidly declined, while greater numbers remained in service in the Far East, where large developed runways were less prevalent. Between mid-1950 and September 1954, several squadrons of RAF Sunderlands saw combat action during the Korean War. Around a dozen aircraft had also participated in the Berlin airlift, delivering supplies to the blockaded German city. The RAF continued to use the Sunderland in a military capacity up to 1959. In December 1960, the French Navy retired their aircraft, which were the last remaining examples in military use within the Northern Hemisphere. The type also remained in service with the RNZAF up to 1967, when they were replaced by the land-based Lockheed P-3 Orion. A number of Sunderlands were converted for use within the civil sector, where they were known as the Hythe and the Sandringham; in this configuration, the type continued in airline operation until 1974. Several examples were preserved, including a single airworthy Sunderland which has been placed on display in Florida at Fantasy of Flight.

Development

Origins
During the early 1930s, there was intense international competition to develop suitable aircraft to operate new long-range intercontinental passenger service between the United Kingdom, the United States, France and Germany. It was recognised that the United Kingdom had no existing equivalent to the new American Sikorsky S-42 flying boats or the German Dornier Do X. Accordingly, in 1934, the British Postmaster General declared that all first-class Royal Mail sent overseas was to travel by air, establishing a subsidy for the development of intercontinental air transport in a fashion similar to the U.S. domestic programme a decade earlier. A corresponding contract was issued to Short Brothers of Rochester for their design, which became the S.23 Empire.

While the Empire flying boat has often been credited as a predecessor of the Sunderland, according to aviation author Geoffrey Norris, this impression "is not strictly true". During November 1933, the British Air Ministry released Specification R.2/33, which called for the development of a next-generation long-range general purpose flying boat, intended to perform ocean reconnaissance missions. The specification envisioned an aircraft, either a monoplane or biplane, which would have to have performance equal to the recently delivered Short Sarafand flying boat, along with various other requirements, including the need to be powered by a maximum of four engines and to be much more compact than the Sarafand.

The release of Specification R.2/33 had been in advance of the publication of the commercial Imperial Airways requirement; by the time that Short received Imperial Airway's priority request, the company had already started planning the design of the prospective military flying boat. After reviewing both sets of requirements, Short decided to prioritise the development of the civil S.23 design but also to work on a response to specification R.2/33.

Chief Designer Arthur Gouge had originally intended for a COW 37 mm gun to be mounted in the bow of the craft to accompany the single Lewis gun installed in its tail. As with the S.23, he made efforts to produce a fuselage that generated the lowest amount of drag possible, while a much longer nose than had been used for the S.23 was ultimately adopted.

Selection
During October 1934, Shorts settled upon the general configuration and geometry of the design, opting for a four-engine shoulder-wing monoplane configuration, similar to the Short Empire that had been ordered at the same time. The military flying boat design received the internal designation of S.25. While the S.25 design bore a strong resemblance to the civil S.23, it featured an improved aerodynamic form, and sheetmetal with curvature in more than one direction, which was more complex to manufacture but gave a more ideal shape.

During late 1934, the S.25 proposal was submitted by the company to the Air Ministry. Rival firm Saunders-Roe had also designed and submitted their own flying boat, known as the Saro A.33, as their response to the issuing of Specification R.2/33. Following an initial evaluation of the submissions, the Ministry decided to place orders for the production of prototypes for both the S.25 and A.33 proposals; this measure was originally made for the purpose of performing flight tests in support of a detailed evaluation, after which production order would be awarded to one of the competitors.

During April 1936, the Air Ministry was sufficiently confident in Short's submission that a development contract for an initial batch of 11 further S.25 boats was issued to the company. On 4 July 1936, the first of the Empire flying boats to be built, G-ADHL, named 'Canopus', conducted its first flight which affirmed the basic principles of the S.25's design while the crucial final design conference was held around the same time as the flight. The competitive fly-off was abandoned after the sole A.33 was destroyed due to a structural failure, resulting in the S.25 being the only candidate.

As construction of the prototype S.25 proceeded, several design changes were performed for various reasons. In terms of its armament, in response to feedback from Air Ministry and Royal Air Force (RAF) experts reviewing the project, it was decided to change its intended defensive weapons, resulting in the switch to a single 0.303 Vickers K machine gun for the nose turret while an arrangement of four 0.303 Browning machine guns in the tail position was also adopted at the same time. The tail turret was also changed to a powered version; Gouge therefore had to devise a solution to account for the resulting movement aft of the aircraft's centre of gravity, which was initially achieved via the presence of ballast positioned in the forward area. By the end of September 1937, the prototype had been completed.

Flight testing
On 16 October 1937, the initial S.25 prototype (K4774) performed the type's maiden flight, fitted with Bristol Pegasus X radial engines capable of generating  of power each. The more powerful Pegasus XXII model was unavailable at the time. Flown by Short's chief test pilot John Lankester Parker and Harold Piper, the initial flight lasted for around 45 minutes; later that day, a second flight of a similar duration was performed. Parker later declared his satisfaction with the basic design. Prior to the first flight, the type had received the name Sunderland.

Following early flight trials with the first prototype, the aircraft was returned to the workshop where it underwent further modifications; the adoption of a wing sweepback of 4° 15' was achieved via the addition of a spacer into the front spar attachments. This design change, which had been made to account for the changes in defensive armament, repositioned the flying boat's centre of lift enough to compensate for the altered centre of gravity; further alterations were necessary to maintain the hydrodynamics properties. On 7 March 1938, K4774 conducted its first post-modification flight, having been outfitted with the intended Bristol Pegasus XXII radial engines, each one capable of generating .

On 21 April 1938, the first Sunderland Mark 1 of the development batch conducted its first flight. By this point, manufacturer testing of the prototype had already been completed and the prototype had been transferred to the Seaplane Experimental Station at Felixstowe, Suffolk for its official evaluation by the Marine Aircraft Experimental Establishment (MAEE); on 8 March 1938, it was joined by the second production aircraft. On 28 May 1938, this second aircraft, which had been cleared for operations under tropical conditions, flew a record-breaking flight to Seletar, Singapore, stopping off along the route at Gibraltar, Malta, Alexandria, Habbaniyah, Bahrain, Karachi, Gwalior, Calcutta, Rangoon, and Mergui.

At this speed and altitude, a consumption rate of  gave the aircraft an endurance of 18 hours, during which it could cover . The take-off distance was found to be .

Design

Overview

The Short S.25 Sunderland was a large four-engined flying boat developed for military use. The design of the S.25 shared much in common with the civil-orientated S.23, principally differing in its use of a deeper hull profile. As with the S.23, the interior of the Sunderland's fuselage contained two individual decks; the lower deck contained a total of six bunks, along with a galley outfitted with a twin kerosene pressure stove, a yacht-style porcelain flush toilet, an anchoring winch, and a small machine shop for performing inflight repairs. The crew was originally intended to total seven members; this was subsequently increased for later versions of the Sunderland to around 11 crew members and sometimes greater, dependent upon the specific mission being undertaken.

The Sunderland featured all-metal, mainly flush-riveted construction, except for the flight control surfaces, which used a fabric-covered metal frame construction. Of these, the flaps employed unusual Gouge-patented devices that slid backwards along curved tracks, moving rearwards and downwards to increase the wing area and generating 30% greater lift for landing. The thick wings, upon which the aircraft's four nacelle-mounted Bristol Pegasus XXII radial engines were carried, also accommodated a total of six drum-style fuel tanks, which possessed a total capacity of 9,200 litres (2,025 Imperial gallons, 2,430 U.S. gallons). In addition to the main fuel tanks, an arrangement of four smaller fuel tanks was installed behind the rear wing spar later on; with the extra tanks fitted, the Sunderland possessed a combined total fuel capacity of 11,602 litres (2,550 Imperial gallons, 3,037 U.S. gallons), which was enough to enable the type to conduct eight- to 14-hour patrols.

The ordnance was stored inside the fuselage in a purpose-built bomb room and was winched up to racks, under the wing centre section, that could be traversed out through doors on each side of the fuselage above the waterline to the release position. Defensive armament included a Nash & Thompson FN-13 powered turret with four .303 British Browning machine guns in the extreme tail and a pair of manually-operated .303 set on either side of the fuselage, firing from ports just below and behind the wings. These machine guns were later upgraded to 0.5-inch calibre Brownings. There were two different nose turret weapons, the most common, later, being two Browning machine guns. The nose weapons were later augmented by four fixed guns, two each side, in the forward fuselage that were fired by the pilot. Much later, a twin-gun turret was to be dorsal-mounted on the upper fuselage, about level with the wing trailing edge, bringing the total defensive armament up to 16 machine guns.

Equipment and on-water management
As with all water-based aircraft, there was a need to be able to navigate on water and to control the craft up to and at a mooring. In addition to the standard navigation lights, there was also a demountable mooring mast that was positioned on the upper fuselage just aft of the astrodome hatch with a 360-degree white light to show that the aircraft was moored. The crewmembers were trained in common marine signals for watercraft to ensure safety in busy waters. The craft could be moored to a buoy by a pendant that attached to the keel under the forward fuselage. When the craft was off the buoy, the forward end of the pendant was attached to the front of the hull just below the bomb aimer's window. For anchoring, there was a demountable bollard that fixed to the forward fuselage from where the front turret was retracted to allow an airman to man the position and pick up the buoy cage or to toss out the anchor.

For taxiing after landing, the galley hatches were used to extend sea drogues that could be used to turn the aircraft or maintain its crosswind progress (by deploying the drogue on one side only), or to slow forward motion as much as possible (both deployed). When not in use, the drogues were hand hauled back inboard, folded, and stowed in wall-mounted containers just below the hatches. Operation of the drogues could be a very dangerous exercise if the aircraft was travelling on the water at speed or in strong currents, because the approximately  drogue would haul up on its five-tonne attachment cable end inside the galley very sharply and powerfully. Once deployed, it was normally impossible to recover a drogue unless the aircraft was stationary relative to the local tidal flow.

Portable beaching gear could be attached by ground crew so that the aircraft could be pulled up on land. The gear consisted of a pair of two-wheeled struts that could be attached to either side of the fuselage, below the wing, with a two- or four-wheel trolley and towbar attached under the rear of the hull. A standard stocked anchor was stowed in the forward compartment alongside the anchor winch. Depending on the operating area, a number of different kinds of anchor could be carried to cope with different anchorages. Another means of direction control on the water was by application of the rudder and aileron flight controls. The ailerons would cause asymmetric lift from the airflow and, ultimately, drop a float into the water to cause drag on that wing. The pilots could vary engine power to control the direction and speed of the aircraft on the water. In adverse combinations of tide, wind, and destination, this could be very difficult.

Access and servicing

The Sunderland was usually entered through the bow compartment door on the left forward side of the aircraft. The internal compartments—bow, gun room, ward room, galley, bomb room and the after compartments—were fitted with swash doors to keep them watertight to about two feet (610 mm) above normal water level; these doors were normally kept closed. There was another external door in the tail compartment on the right side. This door was intended for boarding from a Braby (U-shaped) pontoon that was used where there was a full passenger service mooring alongside a wharf or similar. This door could also be used to accept passengers or stretcher-bound patients when the aircraft was in the open water; this was because the engines had to be kept running to maintain the aircraft's position for the approaching vessel and the front door was too close to the left inboard propeller. Normal access to the external upper parts of the aircraft was through the astrodome hatch at the front of the front spar of the wing centre section, just at the rear of the navigator's station.

Bombs were loaded in through the "bomb doors" that formed the upper half walls of the bomb room on both sides. The bomb racks were able to run in and out from the bomb room on tracks in the underside of the wing. In order to load them, weapons were hoisted up to the extended racks that were run inboard and either lowered to stowages on the floor or prepared for use on the retracted racks above the stowed items. The doors were spring-loaded to pop inwards from their frames and would fall under gravity so that the racks could run out through the space left in the top of the compartment. The bombs could be released locally or remotely from the pilot's position during a bomb run.

Normally, the weapons were either bombs or depth charges and the racks were limited to a maximum of  each. After the first salvo was dropped, the crew had to get the next eight weapons loaded before the pilot had the aircraft positioned on the next bombing run. The fixed nose guns (introduced when in service with Australian units) were removed when the aircraft was on the water and stowed in the gun room just aft of the bow compartment. The toilet was in the right half of this same compartment and stairs from the cockpit to the bow area divided the two.

Maintenance was performed on the engines by opening panels in the leading edge of the wing either side of the powerplant. A plank could be fitted across the front of the engine on the extensions of the open panels. A small manually started auxiliary petrol engine, which was fitted into the leading edge of the right wing, powered a bilge pump for clearing water and other fluids from the fuselage bilges and a fuel pump for refuelling. Generally, the aircraft were reasonably water tight, and two people manually operating a wobble pump could transfer fuel faster than the auxiliary pump. In sheltered moorings or at sea, fuelling was accomplished by a powered or unpowered barge and with engine driven or hand powered pumps. At regular moorings, there would be specially designed refuelling barges to do the job, normally manned by trained marine crew. These vessels could refuel many aircraft during the course of the day. Handling of the fuel nozzles and opening/closing the aircraft fuel tanks would normally be an aircraftman's task.

Airframe repairs were either effected from the inside or delayed until the aircraft was in a sheltered mooring or beached. One serious problem that beset the aircraft was that the heat-treated rivets in the hull plates were susceptible to corrosion after a period in salt water (depending on the quality of the heat treatment process). The heads would pop off from stress corrosion, allowing seawater to leak into the bilges. The only option was to haul the aircraft out onto the "hard" and replace them, usually at the cost of many additional heads breaking off from the vibration of the riveting.

Damage control
A large float mounted under each wing maintained stability on water. With no wind, the float on the heavier side was always in the water; with some wind, the aircraft could be held using the ailerons with both floats out of the water. In the event of a float being broken off for some reason, as the craft lost airspeed after landing crew members would go out onto the opposite wing, to keep the remaining float in the water until the aircraft could reach its mooring. Marine growths on the hull were a problem; the resulting drag could be enough to prevent a fully loaded aircraft from gaining enough speed to become airborne. The aircraft could be taken to a freshwater mooring for sufficient time to kill off the fauna and flora growing on the bottom, which would then be washed away during takeoff runs. The alternative was to scrub it off, either in the water or on land.

Aircraft with lower hull damage were patched or had the holes filled with any materials to hand before landing. The aircraft would then be immediately put onto a slipway with its wheeled beaching gear or beached on a sandy shore before it could sink. More than two fuselage compartments had to be full of water to sink the aircraft. During the Second World War, a number of severely damaged aircraft were deliberately landed on grass airfields ashore. In at least one case, an aircraft that made a grass landing was repaired to fly again. On the Sunderland Mk V, fuel could be dumped from retractable pipes that extended from the hull and were attached to the bomb room side of the galley aft bulkhead. It was expected that dumping would be done while airborne, but it could also be performed while floating on the water, albeit with care to ensure that the floating fuel went downwind away from the aircraft.

The takeoff run of a flying boat was often dependent only on the length of water that was available. The first problem was to gain sufficient speed for the craft to plane, otherwise, there would never be enough speed to become airborne. Once planing, the next problem was to break free from the suction (from Bernoulli's principle) of the water on the hull. This was partly helped by the "step" in the hull just behind the craft's centre of buoyancy at planing speed. The pilot could rock the craft about this point to try to break the downward pull of the water on the surface of the hull. Somewhat rough water was a help in freeing the hull, but on calm days it was often necessary to have a high speed launch cross in front of the aircraft to cause a break in the water flow under the aircraft. It was a matter of judgement of the coxswain to get the crossing close enough but not too close. Because it was expected that some takeoffs would be protracted affairs, often the crews were not very careful to keep within maximum all-up weight limitations, and getting airborne just took a little longer.

Operational history

Second World War

At the outbreak of the Second World War, on 3 September 1939, 39 Sunderlands were in service with the RAF. Although British anti-submarine efforts were disorganized and ineffectual at first, Sunderlands quickly proved useful in the rescue of the crews from torpedoed ships. On 21 September 1939, two Sunderlands rescued the entire 34-man crew of the torpedoed merchantman Kensington Court from the North Sea. As British anti-submarine measures improved, the Sunderland began to inflict losses as well. A Royal Australian Air Force (RAAF) Sunderland (of No. 10 Squadron) made the type's first unassisted kill of a U-boat on 17 July 1940.

During its service, the Sunderland Mark I received various improvements. The nose turret was upgraded with a second .303 (7.7 mm) gun. New propellers together with pneumatic rubber wing de-icing boots were also fitted. Although the .303 guns lacked range and hitting power, the Sunderland had a considerable number of them and it was a well-built machine that was hard to destroy. On 3 April 1940, a Sunderland operating off Norway was attacked by six German Junkers Ju 88C fighters; during the engagement, it shot one down, damaged another enough to cause it to retreat and later perform a forced landing and drove off the rest. The Germans are reputed to have nicknamed the Sunderland the Fliegendes Stachelschwein ("Flying Porcupine") due to its defensive firepower.

Sunderlands also proved themselves in the Mediterranean theatre. They flew many evacuation missions during the German seizure of Crete, carrying as many as 82 passengers. One flew the reconnaissance mission to observe the Italian fleet at anchor in Taranto before the famous Royal Navy Fleet Air Arm's torpedo attack on 11 November 1940.

New weapons made the flying boats more deadly in combat. In 1939 during an accidental fratricidal attack, one  anti-submarine bomb hit the British submarine  doing no more damage than breaking its light bulbs; other bombs had reportedly bounced up and hit their launch aircraft. In early 1943, these ineffective weapons were replaced by Torpex-filled depth charges that would sink to a determined depth and then explode. This eliminated the problem of bounce-back, and the shock wave propagating through the water augmented the explosive effect.

While the bright Leigh searchlight was rarely fitted to Sunderlands, ASV Mark II radar enabled the flying boats to attack U-boats on the surface. In response, the German submarines began to carry a radar warning system known formally as "Metox", and informally as the "Cross of Biscay" due to the appearance of its receiving antenna, that was tuned to the ASV frequency and gave the submarines early warning that an aircraft was in the area. Kills fell off drastically until ASV Mark III radar was introduced in early 1943, which operated in the centimetric band and used antennas mounted in blisters under the wings outboard of the floats, instead of the cluttered stickleback aerials. Sunderland Mark IIIs fitted with ASV Mark III were called Sunderland Mark IIIAs. Centimetric radar was invisible to Metox and baffled the Germans at first. Admiral Karl Dönitz, commander of the German U-boat force, suspected that the British were being informed of submarine movements by spies. In August 1943, a captured RAF airman misled the Germans by telling them that the aircraft were homing in on the signals radiated by the Metox, and consequently U-boat commanders were instructed to turn them off.

The Germans responded to Sunderland attacks by fitting some U-boats with one or two 37 mm and twin quad 20 mm flak guns to fire back at their attackers. While Sunderlands could suppress flak to an extent with their nose turret guns, the U-boats guns had superior range, hitting power and accuracy. Attempting to shoot down Allied aircraft did, however, prolong the U-boat's presence on the surface, which made sinking the vessel easier. Nonetheless, fitting of substantial arrays of anti-aircraft guns temporarily decreased U-boat losses while both Allied aircraft and shipping losses rose. As a countermeasure to the increased defensive armament of the U-boats, the Australians fitted their aircraft in the field with an additional four .303s (7.7 mm) in fixed mounts in the nose, allowing the pilot to add fire while diving on the submarine before bomb release. Most aircraft were similarly modified. The addition of single .50 inch (12.7 mm) flexibly mounted M2 Browning machine guns in the beam hatches behind and above the wing trailing edge also became common.

1943 encounter with Ju 88s

The type's capacity to defend itself was demonstrated in particular by an air battle over the Bay of Biscay on 2 June 1943, when eight Junkers Ju 88Cs attacked a single Sunderland Mk III of No. 461 Squadron RAAF: EJ134, squadron code: "N for Nuts". The 11 crew, led by F/Lt Colin Walker, were on an anti-submarine patrol, while also watching for any signs of a missing airliner, BOAC Flight 777. At 1900 hours, the rear gunner saw the Ju 88s, which belonged to V.Kampfgeschwader 40 and were led by Leutnant Friedrich Maeder. Walker ordered the dumping of the bombs and depth charges, and took the engines to full power. Two Ju 88s made simultaneous passes at EJ134 from both sides, scoring hits and disabling one engine, while the pilots fought fires and took the Sunderland through corkscrew manoeuvres. On a third pass, the dorsal turret gunner badly damaged or shot down a Ju 88, although the Sunderland's rear gunner was knocked unconscious.

The next Ju 88 that attacked was hit by fire from the dorsal and nose turrets, and appeared to have been shot down. By this time, one crew member on the Sunderland had been mortally wounded and most of the others were wounded to varying degrees, while the aircraft's radio gear had been destroyed, among other damage. However, the rear gunner had recovered, and when EJ134 was attacked from behind, another Ju 88 was badly damaged and left the fight. The remaining Ju 88s continued to attack and the front gunner damaged one of these, setting its engines on fire. Two more Ju 88s were also damaged and the Germans disengaged. EJ134 was badly damaged and the crew threw everything they could overboard, while nursing the aircraft over the  journey to Britain. At 2248 hours, Walker managed to beach the aircraft at Praa Sands, Cornwall. The 10 surviving crew members were able to wade ashore, while the Sunderland broke up in the surf. Walker received the Distinguished Service Order and several other crew members also received medals. They claimed three Ju 88s destroyed. (With the exception of Walker, the crew returned to operations in a new "N for Nuts", which was lost over the Bay of Biscay two months later, in an attack by six Ju 88s. On 2 June 2013, a memorial was opened on the green at Praa Sands.)

Postwar

At the end of the Second World War, a number of new Sunderlands built at Belfast were simply taken out to sea and scuttled as there was nothing else to do with them. In Europe the type was removed from service relatively quickly but in the Far East, where well developed runways were less common and large land based maritime patrol aircraft like the new Avro Shackleton could not be used so easily, there was still a need for it, and it remained in service with the RAF Far East Air Force at Singapore until 1959, and with the Royal New Zealand Air Force's No. 5 Squadron RNZAF until 1967.

During the Berlin Airlift (June 1948 – August 1949) 10 Sunderlands and two transport variants (known as "Hythes") were used to transport goods from Finkenwerder on the Elbe near Hamburg to the isolated city, landing on the Havel river near RAF Gatow until it iced over. The Sunderlands were frequently used for transporting salt, as their airframes were already protected against corrosion from seawater. Transporting salt in standard aircraft risked rapid and severe structural corrosion in the event of a spillage. When the Havelsee did freeze over the Sunderland's role was taken by freight-converted Handley Page Halifaxes with salt being carried in panniers fitted under the fuselage to avoid the corrosion problem.

From mid-1950, RAF Sunderlands also saw service during the Korean War initially with No. 88 Squadron but shortly followed by Nos. 205 and 209 Squadrons. The three squadrons shared the operational task equally with rotational detachments of three or four aircraft and crews based at Iwakuni, Japan. Missions lasting 10 to 13 hours were flown daily throughout the war, and also during the Armistice period that followed, until September 1954. The Sunderland also saw service with the RNZAF until 1967.

The French Navy Escadrille 7FE, which received Sunderlands when it was formed in 1943 as No. 343 Squadron RAF, continued to operate them until December 1960, the last unit to operate Sunderlands in the Northern Hemisphere.

Variants

Prototype
The first S.25, now named the Sunderland Mark I, flew from the River Medway on 16 October 1937 with Shorts' Chief Test Pilot, John Lankester Parker at the controls. The deeper hull and installation of nose and tail turrets gave the Sunderland a considerably different appearance from the Empire flying boats. The prototype was fitted with Bristol Pegasus X engines, each providing 950 hp (709 kW ), as the planned Pegasus XXII engines of 1,010 hp (753 kW) were not available at the time.

The 37 mm gun, originally intended as a primary anti-submarine weapon, was dropped from the plans during the prototype phase and replaced with a Nash & Thompson FN-11 nose turret mounting a single .303-inch (7.7 mm) Vickers GO machine gun. The turret could be winched back into the nose, revealing a small "deck" and demountable marine bollard used during mooring manoeuvres on the water. The change of armament in the nose to the much lighter gun moved the centre of gravity rearwards.

After the first series of flights, the prototype was modified to have a wing that was swept 4.25° to the rear, thereby moving the centre of pressure into a more reasonable position in relation to the new centre of gravity. This left the engines and wing floats canted out from the aircraft's centreline. Although the wing loading was much higher than that of any previous Royal Air Force flying boat, a new flap system kept the takeoff run to a reasonable length.

Sunderland Mark I
The RAF received its first Sunderland Mark I in June 1938 when the second production aircraft (L2159) was flown to 230 Squadron at RAF Seletar, Singapore. By the outbreak of war in Europe, in September 1939, RAF Coastal Command was operating 40 Sunderlands.

Later, depth charges (usually 250 lb) were added. By late 1940, two Vickers K machine guns had been added to new hatches that were inserted into the upper sides of the fuselage just aft of the wing, with appropriate slipstream deflectors. A second gun was added to the nose turret. New constant speed propellers and deicing boots were installed as well during 1940.

The Sunderland had difficulty in landing and taking off from rough water, but, other than in the open sea, it could be handled onto and off a short chop, by a skilled pilot. Many rescues were made, early in the war, of crews that were in the Channel having abandoned or ditched their aircraft, or abandoned their ship. During May 1941, during the Battle of Crete Sunderlands transported as many as 82 armed men from place to place in one load. Steep ocean swells were never attempted, however a calm ocean could be suitable for landing and takeoff.

Beginning in October 1941, Sunderlands were fitted with ASV Mark II "Air to Surface Vessel" radar. This was a primitive low frequency radar system operating at a wavelength of 1.5 m, that used a row of four prominent "stickleback" yagi antennas on top of the rear fuselage, two rows of four smaller aerials on either side of the fuselage beneath the stickleback antennas, and a single receiving aerial mounted under each wing outboard of the float and angled outward.

A total of 75 Sunderland Mark Is were built: 60 at Shorts' factories at Rochester and Belfast, Northern Ireland, and 15 by Blackburn Aircraft at Dumbarton.

Sunderland Mark II

In August 1941, production moved on to the Sunderland Mark II which used Pegasus XVIII engines with two-speed superchargers, producing 1,065 hp (794 kW) each.

The tail turret was changed to an FN.4A turret that retained the four .303 guns of its predecessor but provided twice the ammunition capacity with 1,000 rounds per gun. Late production Mark IIs also had an FN.7 dorsal turret, mounted offset to the right just behind the wings and fitted with twin .303 machine guns. The hand held guns behind the wing were removed in these versions.

Only 43 Mark IIs were built, five of these by Blackburn.

Sunderland Mark III

Production quickly changed in December 1941 to the Sunderland Mark III, which featured a revised hull configuration which had been tested on a Mark I the previous June. This modification improved seaworthiness, which had suffered as the weight of the Sunderland increased with new marks and field changes. In earlier Sunderlands, the hull "step" that allows a flying boat to "unstick" from the surface of the sea was an abrupt one, but in the Mk III it was a curve upwards from the forward hull line.

The Mark III turned out to be the definitive Sunderland variant, with 461 built. Most were built by Shorts at Rochester and Belfast, a further 35 at a new (but temporary) Shorts plant at White Cross Bay, Windermere; while 170 were built by Blackburn Aircraft. The Sunderland Mark III proved to be one of the RAF Coastal Command's major weapons against the U-boats, along with the Consolidated Catalina.

As the U-boats began to use Metox passive receivers the ASV Mk II radar gave away the presence of aircraft and the number of sightings diminished drastically. The RAF response was to upgrade to the ASV Mk III, which operated in the 50 cm band, with antennas that could be faired into fewer more streamlined blisters. During the Mk III's life there were a large number of almost continuous improvements made, including the ASV Mk IIIA and four more machine guns in a fixed position in the wall of the forward fuselage just behind the turret (developed on RAAF aircraft first) with a simple bead and ring sight for the pilot. Sunderlands with upgraded ASV Mk III equipment were designated Mk IIIA.

Despite the 14-hour-long patrols expected of their crews, early Sunderland gunners were provided with only 500 rounds of ammunition each. Later 1,000 round ammunition boxes were installed in the turrets. The beam hatch guns were removed from Mk II aircraft but Mk IIIs and then Mk Is gained much more capable .50 (12.7 mm) guns, one each side.

Offensive weapons loads increased too. The introduction of the hydrostatically fused  depth charge meant that additional weapons could be carried on the floor of the bomb room in wooden restraints, along with ammunition boxes of  anti-personnel bombs that could be hand launched from various hatches to harass U-boat crews otherwise manning the twin 37 and dual quadruple 20 mm cannons with which U-boats were fitted.

As radar detection became more effective there were more night patrols to catch U-boats on the surface charging their batteries. Attacking in the dark was a problem that was solved by carrying one inch (25.4 mm), electrically initiated flares and dropping them out of the rear chute of the aircraft as it got close to the surface vessel. Sunderlands were never fitted with Leigh lights.

Sunderland Mark IV

The Sunderland Mark IV was an outgrowth of the 1942 Air Ministry Specification R.8/42, for a generally improved Sunderland with more powerful Bristol Hercules engines, better defensive armament and other enhancements. The new Sunderland was intended for service in the Pacific. Although initially developed and two prototypes built as the "Sunderland Mark IV" it was different enough from the Sunderland line to be given a different name, the S.45 "Seaford".

Relative to the Mark III, the Mark IV had a stronger wing, larger tailplanes and a longer fuselage with some changes in hull form for better performance in the water. The armament was heavier with .50 inch (12.7 mm) machine guns and 20 mm Hispano cannon. The changes were so substantial that the new aircraft was redesignated the Short Seaford. Thirty production examples were ordered; the first delivered too late to see combat and only eight production Seafords were completed and never got beyond operational trials with the RAF.

Sunderland Mark V

The next production version was the Sunderland Mark V, which evolved out of crew concerns over the lack of power of the Pegasus engines. The weight creep (partly due to the addition of radar) that afflicted the Sunderland had resulted in running the Pegasus engines at combat power as a normal procedure and the overburdened engines had to be replaced regularly.

Australian Sunderland crews suggested that the Pegasus engines be replaced by Pratt & Whitney R-1830 Twin Wasp engines. The 14-cylinder engines provided 1,200 hp (895 kW) each and were already in use on RAF Consolidated Catalinas and Douglas Dakotas, and so logistics and maintenance were straightforward. Two Mark IIIs were taken off the production lines in early 1944 and fitted with the American engines. Trials were conducted in early 1944 and the conversion proved all that was expected.

The new engines with new Hamilton Hydromatic constant-speed fully feathering propellers provided greater performance with no real penalty in range. In particular, a Twin Wasp Sunderland could stay airborne if two engines were knocked out on the same wing while, in similar circumstances, a standard Mark III would steadily lose altitude. Production was switched to the Twin Wasp version and the first Mark V reached operational units in February 1945. Defensive armament fits were similar to those of the Mark III, but the Mark V was equipped with new centimetric ASV Mark VI C radar that had been used on some of the last production Mark IIIs as well.

A total of 155 Sunderland Mark Vs were built with another 33 Mark IIIs converted to Mark V specification. With the end of the war, large contracts for the Sunderland were cancelled and the last of these flying boats was delivered in June 1946, with a total production of 777 aircraft completed.

Transport variants

In late 1942, the British Overseas Airways Corporation (BOAC) obtained six Sunderland Mark IIIs, which had been de-militarised on the production line, for service as mail carriers to Nigeria and India, with accommodation for either 22 passengers with 2 tons of freight or 16 passengers with 3 tons of freight. Armament was removed, the gun positions being faired over, and simple seating fitted in place of the bunks. As such they were operated by BOAC and the RAF jointly from Poole to Lagos and Calcutta. Six more Sunderland IIIs were obtained in 1943. Minor modifications to the engine angles and flight angle resulted in a significant increase in the cruise speed, which was a relatively unimportant issue for the combat Sunderlands. In late 1944, the RNZAF acquired four new Sunderland Mk IIIs already configured for transport duties. In the immediate postwar period, these were used by New Zealand's National Airways Corporation to link South Pacific Islands in the "Coral Route" before TEAL Short Sandringhams took over after 1947.

Post-war civilian use
At the war's end BOAC obtained more Mark IIIs and gradually came up with better accommodation for its passengers, in three configurations. Bench seats were removed, and civil-standard seating installed: The H.1 configuration had 16 seats on one deck, while the H.2 had an additional promenade deck, and the H.3 had 24 seats, or sleeping berths for 16. These conversions were given the name Hythe and BOAC operated 29 of them by the end of the war. In February 1946, the first of these, G-AGJM, made a 35,313-mile route survey from Poole to Australia, New Zealand, Hong Kong, Shanghai and Tokyo in 206 flying hours. It was the first British civil flying boat to visit China and Japan.

A more refined civilian conversion of the Sunderland was completed by the manufacturer as the postwar Short Sandringham. The Sandringham Mk. I used Pegasus engines while the Mk. II used Twin Wasp engines.

Operators

Military operators

Royal Australian Air Force
No. 10 Squadron RAAF
No. 40 Squadron RAAF
No. 461 Squadron RAAF
 Royal Canadian Air Force
No. 422 Squadron RCAF
No. 423 Squadron RCAF

French Navy
No. 343 Squadron RAF, later Escadrille 7FE
Flottille 1FE
Flottille 7F
Flottille 27F
Escadrilles 12S
Escadrilles 50S
Escadrilles 53S

Royal New Zealand Air Force
No. 5 Squadron RNZAF
No. 490 Squadron RNZAF
New Zealand Territorial Air Force
No. 6 Squadron TAF
 Norwegian Air Force
No. 330 Squadron RNoAF

Portuguese Navy

South African Air Force
No. 35 Squadron SAAF

Royal Air Force

No. 88 Squadron RAF
No. 95 Squadron RAF
No. 119 Squadron RAF
No. 201 Squadron RAF
No. 202 Squadron RAF
No. 204 Squadron RAF
No. 205 Squadron RAF
No. 209 Squadron RAF

No. 210 Squadron RAF
No. 228 Squadron RAF
No. 230 Squadron RAF
No. 240 Squadron RAF
No. 246 Squadron RAF
No. 259 Squadron RAF
No. 270 Squadron RAF
No. 235 Operational Conversion Unit RAF
 Air Headquarters Iraq Communication Flight

Commercial operators
Aerolíneas Argentinas
Ansett Flying Boat Services flew the Sunderland and its Sandringham variant from Rose Bay on Sydney Harbour to Lord Howe Island until 10 September 1974
Antilles Airboats (US Virgin Islands)
Aquila Airways
British Overseas Airways Corporation
Compañía Aeronáutica Uruguaya S.A. (CAUSA)
Compañía Argentina de Aeronavegación Dodero
Det Norske Luftfartselskap (DNL) – Norwegian Aviation Company (continued as SAS)
New Zealand National Airways Corporation
Qantas (orig. Queensland and Northern Territory Aerial Services)
Trans Oceanic Airways
TEAL (Tasman Empire Airways Ltd, New Zealand)

Survivors

 

ML814 a Mark III, converted to Mark V and then for passenger work, is on display in Kermit Weeks' Fantasy of Flight in Florida, US. It was bought in 1993, and flown across the Atlantic from the UK. According to the FoF website ML814 is the "last 4-engined passenger flying boat that can still fly." Formerly RNZAF NZ4108 – SH.974b MR.5 went to Airlines of New South Wales as VH-BRF "Islander" and was converted to a Sandringham in Australia. Airlines of New South Wales subsequently taken over by the major Australian airline Ansett and became Ansett Flying Boat Services and operated from Rose Bay, Sydney, Australia until 1974. Currently it is the last four-engined passenger flying boat to have crossed a major ocean, although it is reported to be maintained in airworthy condition it has not been flown since 1996 and remained on display in the museum's main hangar for a majority of the 2000s occasionally being towed to the outdoor ramp for certain events.

In addition a few aircraft have been preserved as static museum exhibits.
ML824 is on display in Hangar 1 at the RAF Museum London at Hendon, which acquired it in 1971. The interior of the aircraft is accessible to visitors. Originally preserved at Pembroke Dock after final service with the French Navy. It made its last flight from Lanveoc Pouloc, near Brest to Pembroke on 24 Mar 1961.
ML796 is on display at Imperial War Museum Duxford in Cambridgeshire.
NJ203 RAF Short Sunderland IV/Seaford I S-45 NJ203. 1947 Converted to Short Solent 3 by Short Bros Belfast. 1949 BOAC G-AKNP "City of Cardiff". 1951 Trans Oceanic Airways of Australia as VH-TOB "Star of Papua". 1953 South Pacific Air Lines as N9946F "Isle of Tahiti". Last flew 1958. 1958 Howard Hughes – Hughes Tool Company. Since 1990 it has been on display at the Oakland Aviation Museum, California, USA.
NZ4111 located at the Chatham Islands. Serving with No. 5 Squadron 6 RNZAF March-11 April 1959, coded KN-D; it took part in a flypast to mark the opening of the Auckland Harbour Bridge on 30 May 1959. On 4 November 1959, it was badly damaged in an accident in the Chatham Islands when the Sunderland hit rocks in Te Whanga Lagoon while taxiing and sank in shallow water. It was stripped of usable parts and written off RNZAF books on 9 December 1959. This was the first of the RNZAF Mk.5 Sunderlands to be written off due to damage. The fuselage was broken into major components for use on a farm; the owners are now reassembling the hull and fuselage sections.
NZ4112 – Hulk used by Hobsonville Yacht Club until 1970, then scrapped. Cockpit and front of aircraft transported to the Ferrymead Heritage Park for the Ferrymead Aeronautical Society Inc. Christchurch, New Zealand.
NZ4115 SH.1552b MR.5. Previously SZ584 and BOAC G-AHJR is on display at the Museum of Transport and Technology in Auckland, New Zealand. The interior and cockpit having been extensively restored and hull repairs some reskinning having taken place to airworthy standards and the exterior repainted in NZ4115's later RNZAF maritime scheme Q for Quebec is now displayed inside the MOTAT Aviation Display Hall with Short Bros sister TEAL Short Solent ZK-AMO. Q for Quebec's turrets, armaments and radar and radar domes are being refitted while on display.

Sunderland T9044 was discovered on the seabed off Pembroke Dock in Wales in 2000. The site is protected and recovery of the aircraft is ongoing.

The wreck located by Calshot Divers at Calshot in 2010 is very likely to be that of ML883 and not PP118 as originally thought. This wreck site is awkward to dive due to its proximity to the Fawley Refinery, Solent shipping lane, Calshot RNLI station and public slipway.

Specifications (Sunderland III)

See also

Notes

References

Citations

Bibliography
 Barnes C.H. and Derek N. James. Shorts Aircraft since 1900. London: Putnam, 1989. .
 Bowyer, Chaz. Sunderland at War. Shepperton, Surrey, UK: Ian Allan Ltd., 1976. .
 Bridgman, Leonard, ed. "The Short S-25 Sunderland." Jane's Fighting Aircraft of World War II. London: Studio, 1946. .
 Buttler, Tony, AMRAeS. Short Sunderland (Warpaint Series No. 25). Milton Keynes, UK: Hall Park Books Ltd., 2000.
 Eden, Paul, ed. The Encyclopedia of Aircraft of WW II. Leicester, UK: Silverdale Books/Bookmart Ltd, 2004. .
 Evans, John. The Sunderland Flying-boat Queen, Volume I. Pembroke Dock, Pembrokeshire: Paterchurch Publications, 1987. .
 Evans, John. The Sunderland Flying-boat Queen, Volume II. Pembroke Dock, Pembrokeshire: Paterchurch Publications, 1993. .
 Evans, John. The Sunderland Flying-boat Queen, Volume III. Pembroke Dock, Pembrokeshire: Paterchurch Publications, 2004. .
 Grant, Mark. Australian Airpower 1914 to 1945. Marrickville, NSW: Topmill P/L, 1996. .
 Johnson, Brian. The Secret War. London: BBC (British Broadcasting Corporation), 1978. .
 Kightly, James. "Sunderland Survivors." Aeroplane, February 2009.
 Lake, Jon. Sunderland Squadrons of World War 2. Oxford, UK: Osprey Publishing, 2000. .
 Miller, David. U-Boats: The Illustrated History of The Raiders of The Deep. London: Brassey's Inc., 2002. .
 Norris, Geoffrey. The Short Sunderland (Aircraft in Profile number 189). London: Profile Publications, 1967. No ISBN.
 Nicolaou, Stephane. Flying Boats & Seaplanes: A History from 1905. New York: Zenith Imprint, 1998. .

 Short Sunderland (AP1566). (Suffixes A through E for Mk I through V, -PN and Vols 1 through 4 for Pilots Notes, General Description, Maintenance, Overhaul and Parts Manuals). London: RAF (Air Publication), 1945.
 Simper, Robert. River Medway and the Swale. Lavenham, Suffolk, UK: Creekside Publishing, 1998. .
 Southall, Ivan. Fly West. Woomera: Australia: Angus and Robertson, 1976. .
 Tillman, Barrett. Brassey's D-Day Encyclopedia: The Normandy Invasion A-Z. London: Brassey's, 2004. .

 Werner, H. A. Iron Coffins: A U-boat Commander's War, 1939–45. London: Cassells, 1999. .
 Lake, Alan. FLYING UNITS OF THE RAF – The ancestry, formation and disbandment of all flying units from 1912. England: Alan Lake, 1999, .

External links

 Fighting the U-boats: Short Sunderland
 Short Sunderlands of 205/209 Squadron
 Sunderland Flying Boat 228 Squadron Malta (Photos)
 
 Flight article of 1939
 Calshot's Sunderland Wreck 
 ITV Meridian's PP118 News Story

Sunderland
1930s British patrol aircraft
Flying boats
Four-engined tractor aircraft
High-wing aircraft
World War II British patrol aircraft
Four-engined piston aircraft